Charles Brun (22 November 1821, Toulon – 13 January 1897, Paris) was a 1st class engineer of the French Navy stationed at Rochefort, France.

He was famously involved in building the submarine Plongeur, which had been designed by Simon Bourgeois, in 1862.

Charles Brun later became:
Director of Naval constructions
Member of Parliament for Var (1871–76)
Senator for Var (1876–89)
Minister of Marine and the Colonies from 1883

References

1821 births
1897 deaths
Military personnel from Toulon
Politicians from Toulon
Opportunist Republicans
Ministers of Marine and the Colonies
Members of the National Assembly (1871)
French Senators of the Third Republic
Senators of Var (department)